Sudlersville is a town in the far northeastern corner of Queen Anne's County, Maryland, United States. The ZIP code is 21668 and the area code is 410. The population was 497 at the 2010 census. It is perhaps best known as the hometown of Baseball Hall Of Fame slugger Jimmie Foxx. Other famous residents include astronomer and mathematician Simon Newcomb.

History
Dudley's Chapel and St. Andrew's Episcopal Chapel are listed on the National Register of Historic Places.

Geography
Sudlersville is located at  (39.186348, -75.858138).

Transportation
Roads are the primary means of travel to and from Sudlersville, and the town is served by three state highways. Maryland Route 313 is the primary north-south highway, while Maryland Route 300 is the main east-west highway. Maryland Route 837 serves as a short connector through the center of town, linking MD 300 and MD 313 and providing a truck bypass around the tight intersection in the center of town.

Demographics

2010 census
As of the census of 2010, there were 497 people, 211 households, and 119 families living in the town. The racial makeup of the town was 82.9% White, 6.8% African American, 0.2% Native American, 0.2% Asian, 4.8% from other races, and 5.0% from two or more races. Hispanic or Latino of any race were 7.4% of the population.

There were 211 households, of which 29.4% had children under the age of 18 living with them, 38.9% were married couples living together, 10.9% had a female householder with no husband present, 6.6% had a male householder with no wife present, and 43.6% were non-families. 36.5% of all households were made up of individuals, and 24.2% had someone living alone who was 65 years of age or older. The average household size was 2.31 and the average family size was 2.97.

The median age in the town was 40.8 years. 22.7% of residents were under the age of 18; 7.3% were between the ages of 18 and 24; 24.2% were from 25 to 44; 23.4% were from 45 to 64; and 21.9% were 65 years of age or older. The gender makeup of the town was 46.7% male and 53.3% female.

2000 census
As of the census of 2000, there were 391 people, 167 households, and 106 families living in the town. The racial makeup of the town was 93.35% White, 4.60% African American, 0.26% Native American, 0.51% from other races, and 1.28% from two or more races. Hispanic or Latino of any race were 1.79% of the population.

There were 167 households, out of which 26.9% had children under the age of 18 living with them, 47.9% were married couples living together, 12.6% had a female householder with no husband present, and 36.5% were non-families. 32.9% of all households were made up of individuals, and 18.6% had someone living alone who was 65 years of age or older. The average household size was 2.31 and the average family size was 2.89.

In the town, the population was spread out, with 23.0% under the age of 18, 8.4% from 18 to 24, 27.1% from 25 to 44, 21.2% from 45 to 64, and 20.2% who were 65 years of age or older. The median age was 39 years. For every 100 females, there were 86.2 males. For every 100 females age 18 and over, there were 84.7 males.

The median income for a household in the town was $42,656, and the median income for a family was $50,208. Males had a median income of $32,159 versus $23,250 for females. The per capita income for the town was $19,528. About 6.0% of families and 4.4% of the population were below the poverty line, including none of those under age 18 and 13.2% of those age 65 or over.

Notable people

Jimmie Foxx, (1907–1967), nicknamed "Double X" and "The Beast" was a Hall of Fame professional baseball player known as one of the best power hitters of all time.

References

External links

 Town of Sudlersville website
Map of Sudlersville, from the Historical Society of Kent County collection

Towns in Maryland
Towns in Queen Anne's County, Maryland